Obvio! was a Brazilian automobile manufacturer. The company was specialized in the production of microcars. They produce the Obvio! 828 and the Obvio! 012. These cars were planned to be distributed through ZAP in the United States. However with the Death of greatest Brazilian Vehicle Designer in 2019, the Enterprise was ceased.

They are described as "high performance urban cars". It is a flexible-fuel vehicle that runs on either pure ethanol fuel (E100) or gasoline or any mix thereof.

The chassis is designed as a series of ellipses (a system called "Niess Elliptical Survival Rings") to be strong, yet low in weight. The cars have one bench seat that seats three, and are fitted with airbags. It has McPherson suspension and disc brakes all round. The internal and external panels of the bodyshell are made in ABS/PMMA plastic. It uses scissor doors and also has a Boblbee backpack space integrated into the design.

The 828 has a list price of US$14,000 and the 012 has a list price of US$28,000. Extras offered are air conditioning (hot/cold), individual seats, power windows/rear mirror/central locking, leather seats and an iMobile Carputer.

The Obvio! 828H is hybrid electric concept car that runs on a flex-fuel engines and was presented in Rio de Janeiro on November 2010.

References 

Brazilian brands
Car manufacturers of Brazil
Electric vehicle manufacturers of Brazil